Lorenzo Latham (c. 1812 - December 27, 1860) was during his senior year at Hamilton College a founding member of Alpha Delta Phi (ΑΔΦ), now an international literary and social fraternity, with Samuel Eells and John Curtiss Underwood, who were also seniors, and two juniors, Oliver Andrew Morse and Henry Lemuel Storrs. Most of the actual planning was evidently carried through by Eells, although he and Latham devised the emblems and the symbols.

Latham was a teacher in Natchez, Mississippi, and an associate editor of the Picayune in New Orleans from 1853 to 1860.  He died on December 27, 1860, at his home outside New Orleans, at the age of 48.

References

Hamilton College (New York) alumni
1812 births
1860 deaths
Alpha Delta Phi founders